A cosca (pl. cosche in Italian and coschi in Sicilian), in Sicily, is a clan or Sicilian Mafia crime family led by a capo.

The equivalent in the 'Ndrangheta in Calabria is the 'ndrina.

Etymology
A cosca is the crown of spiny, closely folded leaves on plants such as the artichoke or the thistle, which symbolizes the tightness of relationships between mafiosi.

References

 Blok, Anton (1974/1988). The Mafia of a Sicilian village 1860-1960. A study of violent peasant entrepreneurs, Long Grove (IL): Waveland Press, 
 Dickie, John (2004). Cosa Nostra. A history of the Sicilian Mafia, London: Coronet, 
 Servadio, Gaia (1976). Mafioso. A history of the Mafia from its origins to the present day, London: Secker & Warburg,

External links

Organized crime terminology
Italian words and phrases